Translin-associated protein X (abbr. TSNAX or TRAX) is a protein that in humans is encoded by the TSNAX gene.

Function 

This gene encodes a protein which specifically interacts with translin, a DNA-binding protein that binds consensus sequences at breakpoint junctions of chromosomal translocations. The encoded protein contains bipartite nuclear targeting sequences that may provide nuclear transport for translin, which lacks any nuclear targeting motifs. Both TSNAX and translin form the C3PO complex which facilitates endonucleolytic cleavage of the passenger strand during microRNA loading into the RNA-induced silencing complex (RISC).

Interactions 

TSNAX has been shown to interact with C1D.

References

Further reading

External links 
 

Biology of bipolar disorder